Emily Evan Rae (born May 31, 1999) is an American actress.

Filmography

Awards/Nominations

References

External links

1999 births
21st-century American actresses
Actresses from California
American child actresses
American child models
American female models
American film actresses
American television actresses
Living people
Female models from California